Sydney Santall (10 June 1873 – 19 March 1957) was an English first-class cricketer who played with Warwickshire. His son Reg was later a prolific run maker for them while his other son John had a brief career at Worcestershire.

Santall was a right-arm medium pace bowler and took 1207 wickets for Warwickshire during his 20-year career. His tally remained a county record until surpassed by Eric Hollies in 1949.

External links
CricketArchive

1873 births
1957 deaths
English cricketers
Warwickshire cricketers
London County cricketers
Midland Counties cricketers
A. J. Webbe's XI cricketers